John Paul Leonard (1901–1995) was an American educator, and university president. He was the 5th President of San Francisco State University (SFSU) serving from 1945 to 1957; and the 5th President of American University of Beirut serving from 1957 to 1961.

Early life and education 
John Paul Leonard was born on December 2, 1901, in Lockwood, Missouri. 

Leonard attended Drury University (formerly Drury College), and received a degree in 1923. After his undergraduate graduation he taught in the Springfield Public Schools. Leonard attended Teachers College, Columbia University, and received a master's degree in 1927, followed by his Ph.D.. His his dissertation was titled "The Use of Practice Exercises in Teaching Capitalization and Punctuation."

Career 
Leonard taught at the College of William & Mary; and at Stanford University in academic administration.  

In 1945, Leonard became San Francisco State University's president. During his 12-year tenure Leonard moved the SFSU campus from Haight and Buchanan streets in Lower Haight to its present location in the Parkmerced neighborhood. The move allowed for the school to grow and accommodate the post-World War II influx of students, up to 10,000 enrollees. In order to accomplish this goal, Leonard and students needed to appeal to then-mayor Roger Lapham, which only narrowly won legislative approval. Additionally Leonard reorganized SFSUs academics by combining related academic departments into seven divisions, and they started offering master's degrees.  

From 1961 until 1967, Leonard was a professor at the Teachers College, Columbia and worked on the "The India Project", which resulted in the publishing of academic periodicals, The Indian Educational Mental Measurement Yearbook, and the quarterly The Journal of Indian Education.  

Leonard received honorary degrees from Columbia University in 1954, Drury College in 1962, and the University of the Pacific in 1968.

Death and legacy 
He died on February 24, 1995, in Walnut Creek, California. The main library at SFSU was named in his honor in 1977.

References 

1901 births
1995 deaths
People from Walnut Creek, California
San Francisco State University faculty
College of William & Mary faculty
Stanford University faculty
Academic staff of the American University of Beirut
Teachers College, Columbia University faculty
Teachers College, Columbia University alumni
Drury University alumni
20th-century American academics
People from Dade County, Missouri
American educators
American educational theorists